The Scottish Disability Sport Hall of Fame, launched in 2012 by Scottish Disability Sport (SDS), is an accolade to recognize and honour the outstanding sporting achievements of Scotland's most distinguished athletes with a disability.

History 

The inaugural 20 members of the Scottish Disability Sport Hall of Fame were inducted in 2012, by Scottish Disability Sport (formerly the Scottish Sports Association for Disabled People), as the national sports body celebrated its 50th anniversary at its AGM. It was held at the Windlestrae Hotel in Kinross on 26 September 2012.

Hall of Fame

2012

Post 2012

Awards

References

External links 
SDS Hall of Fame Scottish Disability Sport (SDS).
SDS Hall of Fame Athletes Scottish Disability Sport (SDS).

Scotland
Scotland
Disabled sport
Scotland
Hall of Fame
Scotland
2012 establishments in Scotland